The Free or High Lordship of Zuid-Polsbroek (Dutch: "vrije of hoge heerlijkheid") was a semi-sovereign or 'free or high' fief (allodium), now part of Polsbroek in the Dutch province of Utrecht.

History 
Zuid-Polsbroek, or Polsbroek, was an allodium and a free or high heerlijkheid, a type of local jurisdiction with many rights. Since 1155 the lords of Polsbroek are able to speak the high (blood court)  middle and low justice over their territory. Zuid-Polsbroek was a half-independent (semi-sovereign) entity of the provinces Holland or Utrecht, like the larger Barony of IJsselstein to the east. During the late middle ages it became unsure if Zuid-Polsbroek originally belonged to the States of Holland or to the province (unie) of Utrecht. Polsbroek paid their duties to the States of Holland. When the French introduced the municipal system in the Netherlands in 1807, the rights of the heerlijkheid were largely abolished, although the heerlijkheid itself existed until the early 20th century.

The fief of (Zuid-)Polsbroek was first ruled by the Lords of Arkel since the late 10th century. In later years Polsbroek was ruled by the lords of Woerden van Vliet (until 1423), Viscounts of Montfoort (1423-1481/82), Lords of Bergen from the House of Glymes (1481/82 until 1566), the House of Ligne (from 1566 to 1568) and their following House of Arenberg-Ligne (from 1568 to 1610). Since 1610 the heerlijkheid was a possession of the regentenfamily De Graeff from Amsterdam. When the French introduced the municipal system in the Netherlands in 1795, the rights of the heerlijkheid were largely abolished, although the heerlijkheid itself existed until the early 20th century.

Capacity 
Zuid-Polsbroek was not a very big or important one of the Free or High Lordships of Holland or Utrecht. In 1555, Polsbroek had brought Jean de Ligne an annual income of 954 guilders, made up of rental income (63%), taxes (17%) and manorial rights such as hunting and fishing rights (20%). As for the extent of the property, he was recorded in the books in Jacob Dircksz de Graeff's ownership in 1623 with 692 acres of land and 56

Lords of (Zuid-)Polsbroek 

 -1008 	Foppe van Arkel
 1008-1034 	Johan I van Arkel
 1034-1077 	Johan II van Arkel
 1077-1115/18 	Johan III van Arkel
 1115/18-1140 	Folpert van Arkel van der Leede
 1140-1200 	Herbaren I van der Leede
 1200-1207 	Floris Herbaren van der Leede
 1207-1212 	Folpert II van der Leede
 1212-1234 	Herbaren II van der Leede van Arkel
 1234-1255 	Johan I van der Leede
 1255-1284 	Folpert und Pelgrim van der Leede
 1284-1296 (?) Johan II van der Leede
 (?) 1296-1299  Wolfert I van Borselen
     -1314    Gerrit van Vliet
            Gerard van Vliet
     -1423  Jan van Woerdern van Vliet
 1423-1448  Jan II van Montfoort
 1448-1459  Hendrik IV van Montfoort
 1459-1481/82 Jan III van Montfoort
 1482       Michiel van Glymes van Bergen
 1482-1509  Cornelis van Glymes van Bergen 
 1509-1533  Maximilian van Glymes van Bergen
 1533-1566  Maria of Bergen
 1566-1568  Louis de Ligne
 1568       Jean de Ligne
 1568-1610  Charles de Ligne
 1610-1638  Jacob Dircksz de Graeff
 1638-1664  Cornelis de Graeff
 1664-1707  Pieter de Graeff
 1707-1714  Johan de Graeff 
 1714-1752  Gerrit de Graeff I
 1752-1754  Joan de Graeff 
 1754-1811  Gerrit de Graeff (II) van Zuid-Polsbroek
 1811-1814  Gerrit de Graeff (III.) van Zuid-Polsbroek
 1814-1870  Gerrit de Graeff (IV) van Zuid-Polsbroek
 1870-1912  Dirk de Jongh

External links 

Former polities in the Netherlands